The Ypsilon Bridge is a cable-stayed bridge over Drammenselva in Drammen, located in Viken in Norway. 

The pedestrian bridge connects Kunnskapsparken, the science park of Grønland in Drammen with the city park on Bragernes. The bridge was designed by the firm of Arne Eggen Architects. The three-way bridge has been given the name "Ypsilon" due to its special form – from the air it looks like a Y, with one abutment on the Strømsø side and two at the Bragernes side. The project was co-funded by the municipality of Drammen and Kunnskapsparken AS. Kunnskapsparken accommodates the University of South-Eastern Norway with its campus Drammen, the public library of Drammen, and the Viken Regional Library.

Gallery

See also 

 List of bridges in Norway
 List of bridges in Norway by length
 List of bridges
 List of bridges by length

References

External links
 Ypsilon Bridge on en.broer.no
 Arne Eggen Architects website
 LINK landskap

Bridges in Viken
Cable-stayed bridges in Norway
Bridges completed in 2008
2008 establishments in Norway
Buildings and structures in Drammen
Three-way bridges